Böse Buben (German for Bad Boys) is the name of an association and club of adult gay men in Berlin, Germany, who are interested in SM, especially in flagellation (mostly spanking/caning). Böse Buben is a non-profit organization with the "intention to be a counterbalance to the commercialized scene".

History
Böse Buben usually opens five times a week (Wednesday, Thursday, Friday, Saturday, Sunday).

For nearly 14 years Böse Buben resided in rooms for their own in Neukölln before in mid-2010 the club changed to Sachsendamm 76–77 in Schöneberg.

Böse Buben is participating in the project "safety4free" of manCheck Berlin.

References

External links
 
 Böse Buben @ BDSM Berlin e.V. (German)

BDSM organizations
Gay male BDSM
Gay men's organizations
LGBT culture in Germany
Nightclubs in Berlin